Tarak Dhiab (born January 15, 1954) is a former footballer from Tunisia. The African Footballer of the Year in 1977, he is listed by the Tunisian Football Federation as having 107 caps for the Tunisian national football team, although this number has not been ratified by FIFA. At the 1978 FIFA World Cup, he was a member of the Tunisian national team that was the first national team from African to win a World Cup match. Tarak Dhiab was chosen The Tunisian footballer of the 20th century.

He has served as Minister of Youth and Sports under Prime Minister Hamadi Jebali since December 24, 2011.

Biography

Early life
Dhiab's football talent was discovered by his uncle, Hedi Dhiab.

Soccer career
Dhiab assumed the midfield role with superb passing skills and an excellent scoring record from midfield. He formed a sound understanding with winger Témime Lahzami both at Espérance and on the Tunisian national team.

Dhiab was awarded the African Footballer of the Year title in 1977 and played a pivotal role in helping Tunisia qualifying for the 1978 FIFA World Cup. At the World Cup, Tunisia won a group stage match 3–1 against Mexico, becoming the first national team from Africa to win a match at the World Cup. In coverage relating to the 2006 FIFA World Cup, Dhiab was mentioned as Tunisia's "World Cup legend" by the BBC and as one of Tunisia's greatest World Cup players by the CBC.

He is widely regarded as one of Tunisia's all-time greats, and arguably the greatest midfield playmaker the country has produced. Though he never played in a major European league, many believe he was able to hold his own among international playmakers in this period. Dhiab's international career spanned 15 years; his final international match came against England in 1990.

Personal life
Dhiab's younger brother Lassad Dhiab also followed his footsteps and joined Esperance, having a productive career.

Dhiab is now a television football analyst. He is also a businessman, and Tunisian magazine Réalités reported in 2004 that he was trying to start his own satellite sports channel. He works as a TV presenter and sports analyst for beIN Sports MENA in Doha, Qatar.

Honours

Personal
 Best African Footballer of the Year in 1977
 Best player of the Saudi Professional League in 1983
 Best Tunisian player of the century

Clubs
 Win the Tunisian Ligue six times in 1975, 1976, 1982, 1985, 1988, 1989 with ES Tunis
 Win the Tunisian President Cup five times in 1978, 1979, 1980, 1986, 1989 with ES Tunis
 Win the Saudi King's Cup in 1983 with Al-Ahli SC
 Runner-up in the 1986 Arab Club Champions Cup with ES Tunis

National team
 Participation 1978 FIFA World Cup in Argentina
 Participation in the 1988 Summer Olympics in Seoul

References

External links

1954 births
Living people
Tunisian footballers
1978 FIFA World Cup players
Tunisia international footballers
Olympic footballers of Tunisia
Association football midfielders
Footballers at the 1988 Summer Olympics
1978 African Cup of Nations players
1982 African Cup of Nations players
African Footballer of the Year winners
Expatriate footballers in Saudi Arabia
Tunisian expatriate sportspeople in Saudi Arabia
Al-Ahli Saudi FC players
Espérance Sportive de Tunis players
Tunisian Ligue Professionnelle 1 players
Saudi Professional League players
Competitors at the 1975 Mediterranean Games
Competitors at the 1983 Mediterranean Games
Mediterranean Games bronze medalists for Tunisia
Mediterranean Games medalists in football
Tunisian expatriates in Qatar